Princess Alexandra, 2nd Duchess of Fife,  (17 May 1891 – 26 February 1959), born Lady Alexandra  Duff and known as Princess Arthur of Connaught after her marriage, was the eldest surviving grandchild of King Edward VII. Alexandra and her younger sister, Maud, had the distinction of being the only female-line descendants of a British sovereign officially granted both the title of Princess and the style of Highness.

Lineage and early life

Alexandra's father was Alexander Duff, 1st Duke of Fife. Having succeeded his father as the 6th Earl Fife, he was elevated to Duke of Fife and Marquess of Macduff in the Peerage of the United Kingdom on his marriage in 1889 to Princess Louise of Wales, the eldest daughter of the future Edward VII. Princess Louise accordingly became the Duchess of Fife, and succeeded as the head of many Scottish Feudal Baronies, including MacDuff, named for James Duff, 2nd Earl Fife.

Alexandra was born at East Sheen Lodge, Richmond on 17 May 1891. After ten years of marriage and the birth in 1893 of Alexandra's younger sister Maud, no more children would be born to Alexandra's parents and the dukedom and marquessate of Fife were headed toward extinction since only a male heir could inherit those titles.  On 24 April 1900 Queen Victoria granted Alexander Duff a second dukedom of Fife, along with the earldom of Macduff, stipulating by special remainder that these two titles would jointly devolve, in default of sons born to him and the Queen's granddaughter, upon their daughters in order of seniority of birth, and upon their respective agnatic male descendants in the same order. After her father´s death in 1912 she eventually inherited the Dukedom of Fife.

As a female-line granddaughter of the British monarch, Alexandra was not entitled to the title of "Princess", nor to the style of Her Royal Highness. Instead she was styled Lady Alexandra Duff, as the daughter of a duke, even though she was born fifth in the line of succession to the British throne. Alexandra and her sister were unique among British princesses in that they were descended from both William IV (through his mistress, Dorothea Jordan), and William IV's niece, Queen Victoria, who succeeded him because he left no legitimate issue.

She was baptised at the Chapel Royal, St James's Palace on 29 June 1891 by the Archbishop of Canterbury, Edward White Benson. Her godparents were Queen Victoria and the Prince and Princess of Wales.

Princess Alexandra
On 9 November 1905, King Edward VII declared his eldest daughter Princess Royal. He further ordered Garter King of Arms to gazette Lady Alexandra Duff and her sister Lady Maud Duff with the style and attribute of Highness and the style of Princess prefixed to their respective Christian names, with precedence immediately after all members of the British royal family bearing the style of Royal Highness. From that point, Her Highness Princess Alexandra held her title and rank, not from her ducal father, but from the decree issued by will of the sovereign (her grandfather).

Around 1910, Alexandra became secretly engaged to Prince Christopher of Greece and Denmark, a son of King George I of the Hellenes. The engagement was terminated when their disapproving parents learned of the liaison.

Marriage

On 15 October 1913, Princess Alexandra married her first cousin, once removed, Prince Arthur of Connaught at the Chapel Royal, St. James's Palace, London.

The bride's attendants were: 
 Princess Maud, the bride's sister.
 Princess Mary of the United Kingdom, the bride's maternal first cousin and daughter of King George V.
 Princess Mary of Teck and Princess Helena of Teck, daughters of Prince Adolphus, Duke of Teck (brother of Queen Mary).
 Princess May of Teck, the bride's maternal second cousin and daughter of Prince Alexander of Teck (brother of Queen Mary) and Princess Alice of Albany.

Prince Arthur of Connaught was the only son of the Duke of Connaught and Strathearn, third son of Queen Victoria and thus a younger brother of her maternal grandfather, King Edward VII. As such, Arthur and Alexandra were first cousins once removed.

After their marriage, Alexandra was referred to as HRH Princess Arthur of Connaught, in accordance with the tradition that a wife normally shares the title and style of her husband.

With her husband, Alexandra also carried out royal engagements on behalf of her uncle, King George V, and later for her cousin, King George VI. She also served as a Counsellor of State between 1937 and 1944.

Nursing career 
World War I gave to Princess Arthur of Connaught the opportunity to embrace a vocation of nursing in which she subsequently made a highly successful career. In 1915 she joined the staff of St. Mary's Hospital, Paddington, as a full-time nurse and worked untiringly in this capacity until the armistice. After the war she continued her training at St. Mary's, becoming a state registered nurse in 1919 and being awarded a first prize for a paper on eclampsia. She also served in Queen Charlotte's Hospital where she specialized in gynaecology, receiving a certificate of merit. Throughout these years Princess Arthur increasingly impressed her superiors by her technical skill and practical efficiency.

When her husband was appointed governor-general of the Union of South Africa, Princess Arthur ably seconded him and shared his popularity. Her tact and friendliness made her many friends among the South Africans, who also greatly admired the interest which she displayed in hospitals, child welfare, and maternity work throughout the Union. To these subjects she brought her exceptional personal knowledge and experience, which enabled her to make many effective and valuable suggestions.

On her return to London in 1923, Princess Arthur resumed her nursing career at University College Hospital, where she was known as Nurse Marjorie, and subsequently at Charing Cross Hospital. At this time she was specializing in surgery, proving herself a competent, dependable, and imperturbable theatre sister, who was capable of performing minor operations herself and of instructing juniors in their duties. Her services to the nursing profession were recognized in July 1925, when she was awarded the badge of the Royal Red Cross by George V.

The outbreak of World War II in 1939 afforded Princess Arthur further scope for her nursing abilities. She refused the offer of a post as matron of a hospital in the country, preferring to become sister-in-charge of the casualty clearing station of the Second London General Hospital. Shortly thereafter, she opened the Fife Nursing Home in Bentinck Street which she personally equipped, financed, and administered as matron for ten years with great competence.

On 26 April 1943 her only child, Alastair, Duke of Connaught and Strathearn, died unexpectedly while in Canada.

Later life and death

In 1949 the multiple-rheumatoid-arthritis, from which Princess Arthur had suffered for many years, rendered her completely crippled and necessitated the closing of her nursing-home. She retired to her London home - 64 Avenue Road, St John's Wood, London near Regent's Park where she wrote for private circulation two autobiographical fragments in a vivid and entertaining style: A Nurse's Story (1955) and Egypt and Khartoum (1956), in which she gave a graphic account of the shipwreck of SS Delhi which ran aground in fog and heavy seas in 1911 – Princess Arthur, her sister and mother nearly died and her father, Alexander Duff, 1st Duke of Fife, subsequently died as a result of his injuries.  She was engaged on a further volume on big-game hunting in South Africa when she died at home on 26 February 1959.

At her special request she was cremated, and her ashes were laid in St Ninian's Chapel, Braemar, on the Mar Lodge estate. Her will was sealed in London after her death in 1959. Her estate was valued at £86,217 (or £1.4 million in 2022 when adjusted for inflation).

Titles, styles, honours and arms

Titles and styles

17 May 1891 – 9 November 1905: Lady Alexandra Duff
9 November 1905 – 29 January 1912: Her Highness Princess Alexandra
29 January 1912 – 15 October 1913: Her Highness Princess Alexandra, Duchess of Fife
15 October 1913 – 26 February 1959: Her Royal Highness Princess Arthur of Connaught, Duchess of Fife
Despite the fact that Alexandra and her sister were not daughters of a royal duke, they were sometimes unofficially referred to with the territorial designation of Fife but in official documents, until their marriages, they were always styled Her Highness Princess Alexandra or Maud, without the territorial designation "of Fife".

Honours
 Royal Red Cross
 Dame Grand Cross of the Most Venerable Order of St John of Jerusalem (elevated from Dame of Justice)
 Royal Family Order of King Edward VII
 Royal Family Order of King George V

Honorary military appointments
 Colonel-in-chief, Royal Army Pay Corps

Political appointment
Counselor of State {1944}

Arms

Ancestry

References and notes

 Ronald Allison and Sarah Riddell, eds., The Royal Encyclopedia (London: Macmillan, 1991); 
 Marlene A. Eilers, Queen Victoria's Descendants (New York: Atlantic International Publishing, 1987); 
 Alison Weir, Britain's Royal Families: the Complete Genealogy, rev. ed. (London: Pimlico, 1996); 

1891 births
1959 deaths
Fife
British princesses
Wives of British princes
Wives of knights
Dames Grand Cross of the Order of St John
Daughters of British dukes
Dukes of Fife
Hereditary women peers
House of Saxe-Coburg and Gotha (United Kingdom)
Members of the Royal Red Cross
People from East Sheen
Edwardian era
British nurses